Kilwa may refer to:

Tanzania 

 Kilwa Kisiwani, a historic Swahili city-state island settlement in Lindi Region, across from the town of Kilwa Masoko
 Kilwa Masoko, a mainland port town and capital of Kilwa District, across from Kilwa Kisiwani, Lindi Region
 Kilwa District one of the districts of Lindi Region in southeastern Tanzania
 Kilwa Sultanate, a Medieval Swahili sultanate, centered at Kilwa in modern-day Tanzania

Elsewhere

 Kilwa, Democratic Republic of the Congo, a town in the Democratic Republic of the Congo, on the south-west shore of Lake Mweru
 Kilwa Island, 6 km from Kilwa, Katanga, but in Zambian territory